Brener may refer to:

 Brener (footballer) (born 1975), Brazilian football player
 Abraham Moshe Brener (d. 1968), Polish-born rabbi
 Alexander Brener (born 1957), Russian performance artist
 Angèle Diabang Brener (born 1979), Senegalese screenwriter, director and film producer
 Avia Brener (born 1994), Israeli acrobatic gymnast
 Fabricio Brener (born 1998), Argentine football player
 Igal Brener, Israeli-American physicist
 Ilja Brener (born 1989), Russian-born German chess player
 Josh Brener (born 1984), American actor
 Mark Brener, American businessman
 Moshe Brener (born 1971), Israeli basketball player
 Pynchas Brener (born 1931), Ashkenazi rabbi
 Roland Brener (1942–2006), South African-born Canadian artist
 Roman Brener (1932–1991), Soviet and Ukrainian diver and pool player
 Sandra Brener Rosenthal (born 1936), American philosopher
 Sergey Brener (born 1971), Uzbekistani freestyle skier
 Shmulik Brener (born 1981), Israeli basketball player and coach
 Yolande Brener, English author and actress

See also
 Brenner (surname)